The 2008 Colorado State Rams football team  represented Colorado State University in the 2008 NCAA Division I FBS football season. They played their home games at Sonny Lubick Field at Hughes Stadium in Fort Collins, CO and were led by first year coach Steve Fairchild. They were members of the Mountain West Conference. They finished the season 7–6, 4–4 in Mountain West play to finish in fifth place. They were invited to the New Mexico Bowl where they defeated Fresno State.

Schedule

References

Colorado State
Colorado State Rams football seasons
New Mexico Bowl champion seasons
Colorado State Rams football